Fløistad is a surname. Notable people with the surname include:

Guttorm Fløistad (1878–1953), Norwegian farmer, bailiff, and politician
Guttorm Fløistad (born 1930), Norwegian philosopher
Ivar Fløistad (1846–1926), Norwegian bailiff and politician